Dong Hewei is a visually impaired Paralympian athlete from China competing mainly in T11 classification sprint and long jump events. Zhou won two medals at her first Summer Paralympics, the 2012 London Games, in the women's 200m sprint (bronze) and the long jump (silver). Jia is also a World Championships and Asian Games medalists, winning seven medals over five tournaments.

Notes

Chinese female triple jumpers
Paralympic athletes of China
Athletes (track and field) at the 2012 Summer Paralympics
Paralympic bronze medalists for China
Living people
Medalists at the 2012 Summer Paralympics
Sportspeople from Hangzhou
Athletes from Zhejiang
Year of birth missing (living people)
Paralympic medalists in athletics (track and field)